WOWtv is a Canadian exempt Category B Chinese language specialty channel and is owned by Canadian Chinese Media Network (CCMN). WOWtv broadcasts programming in Cantonese, Mandarin and Vietnamese from predominantly foreign sources as well as local Canadian programming.

The channel launched on April 29, 2009 exclusively on Rogers Cable. On December 2, 2009, WOWtv launched a high-definition (HD) channel called WOWtv HD, which simulcast the standard definition feed, on Rogers Cable. In June 2010, WOWtv HD launched on Bell Fibe TV. On September 25, 2012, WOWtv launched their western feed to Vancouver, Calgary and Edmonton via Telus Optik TV.

WOW TV head office is now in Markham moved from the original Toronto (Agincourt) studios.

References

External links
  
 CCMN 

Digital cable television networks in Canada
Chinese-language mass media in Canada
Companies based in Markham, Ontario
Multicultural and ethnic television in Canada
Television channels and stations established in 2009